Alan Gray (born 2 May 1974) is an English former professional footballer, who played for Doncaster Rovers, Darlington and Carlisle United in the Football League and Queen of the South in the Scottish Football League.

References

External links

Living people
1974 births
Footballers from Carlisle, Cumbria
Association football fullbacks
Doncaster Rovers F.C. players
Bishop Auckland F.C. players
Darlington F.C. players
Carlisle United F.C. players
Workington A.F.C. players
Queen of the South F.C. players
English Football League players
Scottish Football League players
English footballers